Pigeons Playing Ping Pong is an American funk jam band from Baltimore, Maryland. The band has garnered a following as a result of their consistent touring, playing as many as two hundred shows a year.

History
Pigeons Playing Ping Pong began in 2009. They released their first full-length album titled Funk E P in 2010. This album name is a play on words says vocalist/guitarist Greg Ormont, and unfortunately the name led people to think this first album was just an EP. In July 2014, Pigeons Playing Ping Pong released their second full-length album titled Psychology. Pigeons Playing Ping Pong has hosted Domefest every year since 2009. The location of the festival has changed periodically but is currently held at Legend Valley in Thornville, OH. In a 2017 interview, Greg Ormont (vocals/guitar) said, "We met in college at the University of Maryland and the dorm project turned into the real thing. We've been playing for over 8 years. We've been touring the country for 4–5 years and just having a blast spreading our high energy psychedelic funk and good vibes. We like to bring the party and show people a diverse time that is positive and fun and everyone leaves a happier person.”

In April of 2022, Pigeons Playing Ping Pong released their 6th studio album, Perspecitve.

Personnel

Band members

Current members
Greg Ormont – Lead Vocals, Guitar (2009–present)
Jeremy Schon – Guitar (2009–present)
Ben Carrey – Bass (2009–present)
Alex Petropulos – Drums (2015–present)

Former members
Dan Schwartz – Drums (2009–2015)

Crew
Manny Newman – Lighting Director (2015–present)
Ivan LaRocca – FOH Engineer (2022–present)

Former Crew

Erich Miller: FOH Engineer (2016-2022)
Dante DiLoreto: Monitor Engineer
Kevin McKay: Tour Manager
Aaron Kovelman: Lighting Director

Discography
Studio albums
Funk E P (2010, self-released)
Psychology (2014, self-released)
Pleasure (2016, self-released)
Pizazz (2017, self-released)
Presto (2020, self-released)
Perspective (2022, self-released)

Live Albums
 The Great Outdoors Jam (2017)
 Stop Making Cake: Halloween 2019 (Live in New Haven, CT) (2020)

References

2009 establishments in Maryland
Jam bands
Musical groups established in 2009
Musical groups from Baltimore